Pierre François Laureys (7 August 1919 – 18 December 2004) was a flying ace for the Free French, arms dealer, and printer.

Early life
Pierre Laureys was born on 7 August 1919 as the son of a photo-engraver. He followed in the footsteps of his father after completing his secondary education, until war broke out in September 1939. He followed his training as a pilot at the aviation school of Vannes.

World War II

In June 1940, Laureys embarked at Saint-Jean-de-Luz on a boat repatriating Polish troops and reached the United Kingdom. There, he registered under the alias of François Kennard as a member of the Free French of Charles de Gaulle. In May 1942, he became a member of the île de France group. During the Dieppe Raid on 19 August 1942, Laureys obtained two victories over two Dornier Do 217 planes of the Luftwaffe.

After several more victories, he was promoted a Captain at the time of the Normandy landings.

Later career
Laureys became a Companion of the Liberation and was demobilised in December 1945. In Cyprus and Algeria, he was the head of press agency Air in 1956 and 1957. He would establish more than ten graphic arts enterprises, for example Presse aéronautique associée.

During the 1960s, Laureys became an arms dealer, providing aviation resources for several conflicts around the globe, but also for a Hollywood film. In one scene of the 1962 film The Longest Day, the makers needed some Supermarine Spitfire fighter aircraft. Laureys restored and provided three Spitfires, and flew one of the planes himself in the film.

During the Congo Crisis, several French officers and soldiers were enrolled at the Katangese armed forces of Moïse Tshombe's secessionist State of Katanga, including fellow Companion of the Liberation Edgard Tupët-Thomé, Roger Trinquier, and Roger Faulques. Laureys sold many items to Katanga, including North American P-51 Mustang aircraft.

During the North Yemen Civil War, Laureys shipped the first batch of arms to the mercenaries allied with the Royalists such as Bob Denard.

Finally, during the Nigerian Civil War, he sold two Douglas A-26 Invader aircraft to the mercenaries of the Biafran Air Force. One of them, registered under RB-26P, it was first sold to aerial survey company Société Carta by the Armée de l'Air in 1966, and last seen at Creil near Paris in June 1967. Then, it was sold by Laureys to Biafra, and flown to Biafra in August 1967 by two American pilots. Furthermore, he provided Biafra with Alouette helicopters, and pilots.

Distinctions
Commander of the Legion of Honour 
Companion of the Liberation (decree of 28 May 1945)
Croix de Guerre 1939–1945
Cross for Military Valour
Escapees' Medal
Commander of the Arts and Letters
Distinguished Flying Cross (United Kingdom)
Air Medal

See also
List of World War II aces from France

References

1919 births
2004 deaths
Military personnel from Paris
French Resistance members
Arms traders
Arms trafficking
Companions of the Liberation
French World War II flying aces